A golfer is someone who plays golf. Below is a list of female golfers, professional and amateurs, sorted alphabetically. :Category:Lists of golfers contains lists of golfers sorted in several other ways: by nationality, by tour and by type of major championship won (men's, women's or senior).

All members of the World Golf Hall of Fame are listed, including those inducted for their off-course contributions to the sport. World Golf Hall of Fame members are annotated HoF.

A

B

C

D

E

F

G

H

I

J

K

L

M

N

O

P

Q

R

S

T

U

V

W

X
None

Y

Z

See also
List of sportspeople